The Lincoln School, at 914 State St. in Fort Morgan, Colorado, was built in 1909 and expanded in 1920.  It was listed on the National Register of Historic Places in 2010.

The original or expansion was designed by British-born Denver-based architect John J. Huddart in Mission/Spanish Revival style.

It has also been known as the School for the Performing Arts.

According to the School for the Performing Arts' webpage, the school was originally opened in 1909 and became open as the School for the Performing Arts on the 100th anniversary of the building.

The National Register listing was in "recognition of this property’s contribution to the heritage of the State of Colorado."

References

Schools in Colorado
National Register of Historic Places in Morgan County, Colorado
Mission Revival architecture in Colorado
School buildings completed in 1920
1920 establishments in Colorado